Otselic may refer to the following in the U.S. state of New York:

Otselic, New York, a town in Chenango County
Otselic, a community in the above town
Otselic River, a tributary of the Tioughnioga River